The Torture Technique is the second studio album by Sister Machine Gun, released on March 15, 1994 by TVT and Wax Trax! Records. The album spent eight weeks on the CMJ Radio Top 150 peaking at #46, and nine weeks on the CMJ RPM Charts peaking at #10.

Reception

Vincent Jeffries of allmusic gave The Torture Technique a one and a half out of five stars, saying "to Chris Randall's credit, he expands his programming skills ("Salvation," "Brother Bomb") and vocal performances ("Cocaine Jesus") enough to mimic industrial rock success stories Ministry and White Zombie, instead of exclusively copying Nine Inch Nails." He concluded by saying, "The Torture Technique isn't as dry or repetitive as Sister Machine Gun's first release, but Randall's marginal improvements aren't enough to warrant a recommendation." Aiding & Abetting praised the very stripped down sound of the album, saying it's "experimental enough to get me hard, bouncy enough to make me dance, Sister Machine Gun is rather good." Option gave the album a favorable review saying it "...enthusiastically embraces industrial dance styles without being limited by them..."

Track listing

Personnel
Adapted from the liner notes of The Torture Technique.

Sister Machine Gun
 Tom Gaul – guitar
 Chris Kelly – keyboards, backing vocals
 Chris Randall – lead vocals, keyboards, programming, production, mixing
 Steve Stoll – drums

Additional performers
 En Esch – drums, guitar
 Derek Frigo – guitar
 Charles Levi – bass guitar, guitar
 Jim Marcus – programming, additional vocals, editing, production, recording, mixing
 James Woolley – keyboards, editing

Production and design
 Van Christie – production, recording, mixing
 Noli Eckerson – assistant recording
 Bill Garcelon – assistant recording
 Dave Kovach – assistant recording
 Steve Levy – assistant recording
 Jason McNinch – assistant recording
 Matt Warren – assistant recording

Release history

References

External links 
 
 

1994 albums
Sister Machine Gun albums
TVT Records albums
Wax Trax! Records albums